Richard Archibald (born 18 January 1978 in Coleraine, United Kingdom) is an Irish rower. He finished 6th in the men's lightweight coxless four at the 2004 Summer Olympics. He rowed for Coleraine Academical Institution Boat Club and Queen's University Belfast Boat Club.

References

External links
 
 
 

1978 births
Living people
Irish male rowers
Rowers at the 2004 Summer Olympics
Rowers at the 2008 Summer Olympics
Olympic rowers of Ireland
World Rowing Championships medalists for Ireland
21st-century Irish people